The 2008–09 season was ACF Fiorentina's 83rd season in Italian football and their 71st season in the first-tier of Italian football, Serie A. Having finished fourth the previous season, La Viola earned qualification to the UEFA Champions League for the first time in eight years.

Players

Squad information
As of 26 July 2008

Transfers

In

Summer transfer window

Winter transfer window

Out

Summer transfer window

Winter transfer window

On loan

Pre-season and friendlies

Competitions

Overall

Last updated: 31 May 2009

Serie A

League table

Results summary

Results by round

Matches

Coppa Italia

UEFA Champions League

Third qualifying round

Group stage

UEFA Cup

Final phase

Round of 32

Statistics

Appearances and goals

|-
|colspan="10"|Players sold or loaned out during the 2009 winter transfer window:

|}

Goalscorers

Last updated:

Clean sheets

Last updated:

Disciplinary record

Last updated:

References

ACF Fiorentina seasons
Fiorentina